O4 may refer to:
 LNER Class O4, a class of ex-Great Central Railway 2-8-0 steam tender locomotives
 Taff Vale Railway O4 class, a class of 0-6-2T steam tank locomotives
 USS O-4 (SS-65), a 1917 United States O class submarine
 O-4, the pay grade for the following officer ranks in the U.S. uniformed services:
 Major in the Army, Marine Corps, Air Force, and Space Force
 Lieutenant Commander in the Navy, Coast Guard, Public Health Service Commissioned Corps, and NOAA Commissioned Officer Corps
 Tetraoxygen (O4), oxozone
 a class of stars in the stellar classification
 Otoyol 4, a highway from Istanbul to Ankara, Turkey
 Martin XO-4, an observation aircraft proposed by the Glenn L. Martin Company
 , the orthogonal group in dimension 4

See also
 04 (disambiguation)
 4O (disambiguation)